Ballophilus is the largest genus of centipedes in the family Ballophilidae, with about 40 species. Centipedes in this genus range from 1 cm to 7 cm in length, have 37 to 91 pairs of legs, and are found in tropical and subtropical regions, mainly in Africa and southeast Asia. 

This genus includes the following species:

 Ballophilus alluaudi
 Ballophilus australiae
 Ballophilus braunsi
 Ballophilus clavicornis
 Ballophilus comastes
 Ballophilus conservatus
 Ballophilus differens
 Ballophilus fijiensis
 Ballophilus filiformis
 Ballophilus flavescens
 Ballophilus foresti
 Ballophilus giganteus
 Ballophilus granulosus
 Ballophilus hounselli
 Ballophilus insperatus
 Ballophilus kraepelini
 Ballophilus latisternus
 Ballophilus lawrencei
 Ballophilus liber
 Ballophilus maculosus
 Ballophilus maldivensis
 Ballophilus mauritianus
 Ballophilus neocaledonicus
 Ballophilus pallidus
 Ballophilus paucipes
 Ballophilus pedadanus
 Ballophilus peruanus
 Ballophilus polypus
 Ballophilus pygmaeus
 Ballophilus ramirezi
 Ballophilus riveroi
 Ballophilus rouxi
 Ballophilus sabesinus
 Ballophilus smaragdus
 Ballophilus taenioformis
 Ballophilus tercrux

References

Ballophilidae
Centipede genera